Bagby may refer to:

People
Bagby (surname)

Places
Bagby, North Yorkshire, England
Bagby, California, US
Independence, Kentucky, US, formerly known as Bagby
Bagby, Virginia, US
Bagby Hot Springs, Oregon, US

Other
Sir Bagby, American comic strip